Dhaurhara may refer to:

Places
 Dhaurahra, Lucknow, a village in Lucknow district of Uttar Pradesh, India
 Dhaurahra, Raebareli, a village in Raebareli district of Uttar Pradesh, India
 Dhaurehra, a town in Lakhimpur Kheri district of Uttar Pradesh, India
 Dhaurahra (Assembly constituency)
 Dhaurahra (Lok Sabha constituency)

See also 
 Dharhara (disambiguation)
 Dharahara